The Battle of Hill 170 was a battle between the British 3rd Commando Brigade and the Japanese 54th Division during the Second World War. The battle was fought in January 1945, as part of the Burma Campaign.

The 3rd Commando Brigade were given the task of assaulting the Arakan Peninsula at Myebon. Here they were to take and hold the dominant features of the southern Chin Hills. If they could achieve this, they would cut off the supply and escape routes of the Japanese to Rangoon and secure the bridgehead. The battle for Hill 170 was the climax of the Arakan operations, and its outcome broke the spirit of the Japanese 54th Division. Had the commandos' positions fallen, this would have endangered all the Allied units that had landed on the Myebon Peninsula.

After the battle, the commander of the XV Indian Corps—Lieutenant General Sir Philip Christison—stated in a special order of the day to the 3rd Commando Brigade, "The Battle of Kangaw had been the decisive battle of the whole Arakan campaign and that it was won was very largely due to your magnificent defence of Hill 170."

Background
In late December 1944, XV Indian Corps—commanded by Lieutenant General Christison—went on the offensive, and on 29 December the 3rd Commando Brigade—then commanded by Brigadier Campbell Hardy—carried out an unopposed landing on the island of Akyab. Following this reconnaissance, operations were undertaken around the Myebon Peninsula and on the surrounding islands. During one of these patrols, a group of commandos from No. 5 Commando had a brief contact with a Japanese force during which they killed four Japanese without suffering loss themselves.

On 12 January 1945, the commando brigade carried out a landing on the peninsula. Coming ashore in the second wave behind No. 42 (Royal Marine) Commando, No. 5 Commando carried the advance inland until they came under machine gun fire from a hill that had been named 'Rose' by the planning staff. The following morning, after air support was called in and tanks from the 19th Lancers were brought up, No. 5 Commando launched an attack on the position. In the end, the attack was successful and as the defenders chose to fight to the death, no prisoners were taken.

For the next couple of days, No. 5 Commando carried out patrols throughout the peninsula as the enemy were cleared from the area, before they were withdrawn to the beachhead for a couple of days rest. After this, the brigade captured the village of Kantha as a preliminary move on Kangaw, across a number of waterways on the mainland, where Christison had decided that he wanted to cut the Japanese line of withdrawal. The terrain was difficult, with no roads and consisting of mangrove swamps and rice paddies that prevented tanks or artillery coming ashore initially. The whole area was dominated by a small wooded ridge known as Hill 170.

Battle

The brigade landed without any naval or air bombardment in an attempt to surprise the Japanese. "Milford" was secured on 22 January and "Pinner" the following day. All the objectives were taken with minimal Japanese resistance. Over the night of 23/24 January, the Japanese attacked "Pinner" and an artillery barrage unprecedented for the theatre of war landed on Hill 170 and would continue for the next four days.

On 26 January, 51st Indian Infantry Brigade—supported by a troop of Sherman tanks from the 19th Lancers—arrived from the beachhead and took over the positions of 44 Commando on "Milford" and "Pinner". On the night of 28/29 January, 51st Brigade attacked Kangaw and two heights codenamed "Perth" and "Melrose" which dominated the road east from Kangow. Though they only partially achieved their objectives as the Japanese resistance along their withdrawal route was increasing, Kangaw was captured and the British occupied positions to dominate the main road.

Japanese counter-attack
The plan was for 3 Commando Brigade to withdraw on 30 January but the plans were halted by a new Japanese counter-attack on the brigade's positions by the 154th Infantry Regiment. The next morning at 05:45, the 2nd Battalion, 154th Infantry Regiment launched a surprise attack on Hill 170 under cover of a fierce artillery bombardment and heavy machine gun fire. The focus of their attack was the northern end of Hill 170 defended by No. 4 Troop, No. 1 Commando. The troop's position was ringed by gunfire in a preliminary to a major attack. Throwing grenades in front of them, the Japanese attacked at 07:30 on a  front platoon by platoon.

Hill 170 was now defended by No. 1 and No. 42 commandos supported by a tank troop from the 19th Lancers. The tanks at the northern end of the hill were attacked in a suicidal assault by Japanese engineers armed with explosive charges on the end of bamboo poles. The engineers destroyed two of the three Sherman tanks after a hand-to-hand battle by climbing on top of them and exploding their charges.

The Japanese infantry attacked Hill 170 throughout the rest of the day, the brunt of these attacks falling on No. 4 Troop of No. 1 Commando. At 09:30, a counter-attack was launched by W Troop, No. 42 Commando and No. 3 Troop, No. 1 Commando, that had to be abandoned after advancing only  against massed machine gun fire. The next counter-attack was by X Troop, No. 42 Commando supported by the remaining Sherman tank that also failed in the face of the heavy Japanese fire. The commandos then responded by bringing all available artillery and mortar fire down on the Japanese positions. At 14:00, No. 6 Troop, No. 1 Commando put in a counter-attack but this also failed, with the troop losing nearly half of its men. To the east of Hill 170 on "Pinner", No. 5 Commando was by then relieved by the 8/19th Hyderabad Regiment from the 51st Brigade and rejoined the 3rd Commando Brigade on Hill 170, their machine guns adding to the weight of fire brought to bear on the Japanese. At 16:00, the 2/2nd Punjab Regiment from the 51st Brigade managed to work their way around the left flank of Hill 170 and engaged the Japanese from there. At the same time No. 5 Commando were moved forward to take over the front line from No.4 Troop except for one section that had been cut off and overrun. Just after 17:00 some Japanese were seen to be withdrawing from the hill and the 2/2nd Punjabi Regiment started a flanking night attack but this failed to drive the Japanese off their positions on the hill. The Japanese responded with a night attack of their own against No. 5 Commando's positions that also failed.

An estimated 700 Japanese shells landed on the hill during the last day of the battle. In a day of continuous fighting, much of it hand-to-hand, the men of No. 1 and No. 42 commandos had repulsed and counter-attacked the waves of Japanese infantry. Early the following morning, No. 5 Commando was able to move forward and found the hill abandoned, apart from over 340 Japanese dead. The British losses for the battle were 45 dead and 90 wounded.

Aftermath
The commandos' victory in the 36-hour battle for Hill 170 cut off the escape of the 54th Japanese Division. Further amphibious landings by the 25th Indian Infantry Division and the overland advance of the 82nd (West Africa) Division made the Japanese position in the Arakan untenable and they ordered a general withdrawal to avoid the complete destruction of the Twenty-Eighth Japanese Army.

In recognition of the battle, the commandos were awarded the battle honour Kangaw. The men of 3rd Commando Brigade were awarded a number of decorations for gallantry, which included a posthumous Victoria Cross for Lieutenant George Knowland No. 4 Troop, No.1 Commando. His citation reads:

See also

Notes

References

External links
 Indian Corps special order of the day 17 February 1945
 No. 1 Commando
 No. 5 Commando 
 42 Commando

1945 in Burma
Battles of World War II involving Japan
Conflicts in 1945
January 1945 events in Asia
Military history of Burma during World War II
World War II British Commando raids